Baltag is a Romanian surname. Notable people with the surname include:

 Cezar Baltag (1939 – 1997), Romanian poet
 Iulian Baltag (born 1986), Moldovan chess master
 Sabina Baltag (born 2001), Romanian weightlifter

Romanian-language surnames